Zhassulan Kydyrbayev (born 28 September 1992) is a Kazakh weightlifter.

He achieved 179 kg in snatch and 229 kg in clean and jerk, giving him a gold medal total of 408 kg at the 2014 World Weightlifting Championships in his home town, in Almaty. Kydyrbayev had come back from a two-year doping ban only three days prior. He was serving a period of ineligibility from 11 November 2012 to 11 November 2014 after having tested positive for the anabolic steroid stanozolol.

References

External links
 

1992 births
Living people
Kazakhstani male weightlifters
Kazakhstani sportspeople in doping cases
Doping cases in weightlifting
World Weightlifting Championships medalists
Sportspeople from Almaty
21st-century Kazakhstani people